Guillermo Morón Montero (8 February 1926 – 19 November 2021) was a Venezuelan writer and historian. Guillermo Morón has won awards including the Municipal Prize of Literature (Narrative mention) (1987), and the National Prize for Literature (1990).

Published works 
 El libro de la fe (1955)
 Los Cronistas y la Historia (1957)
 Los borradores de un Meditador (1958)
 Historia de Venezuela (1960)
 Historia política de José Ortega y Gasset  (1960)
 Imágenes y nombres (1972)
 Microhistorias (1980)
 Textos sobre Lisandro Alvarado (1981)
 Historia de Francisco y otras maravillas (1982)
 El gallo de las espuelas de oro (1984)
 Homenaje a Don Rómulo Gallegos (1984)
 Ciertos animales criollos (1985)
 Los más antiguos (1986)
 Son españoles (1989)
 Los presidentes de Venezuela (1993)
 El catálogo de las mujeres (1994)
 Patiquines, pavorreales y y notables (2002)
 Memorial de agravios (2005)

See also 
Venezuela
Venezuelan literature

References

External links
  Review about Guillermo Morón at the National Academy of History website
  Biography and chronology of Morón by Roberto J. Lovera De-Sola at Obra escogida de Guillermo Morón, Biblioteca Ayacucho, 1995

1926 births
2021 deaths
People from Lara (state)
Venezuelan male writers
20th-century Venezuelan historians
Academic staff of Simón Bolívar University (Venezuela)
21st-century Venezuelan historians
Death in Caracas